It Wasn't A Dream, It Was A Flood is a 1974 autobiographical, 16mm short film about poet Frank Stanford, made by Stanford and his publisher, Irv Broughton. Stanford appears charismatic and passionate in the 25-minute film, which interviews friends on whom Stanford's literary characters were sometimes based.

The film won one of the Judge's Awards at the 1975 Northwest Film & Video Festival. It has never been released in theaters or on home video.

The film was screened on July 26, 1997 at Vox Anima Artspace and October 18, 2008 at the Frank Stanford Literary Festival, both in Fayetteville, Arkansas.

References

1974 short films
1970s short documentary films
Autobiographical documentary films
1974 documentary films
1974 films
Documentary films about poets
American short documentary films
1970s American films